Alan Ogley is a footballer who played as a goalkeeper in the Football League for Barnsley, Manchester City, Stockport County and Darlington. He played for the Division One championship-winning side in 1967–68, although he only made 2 appearances as third choice behind Ken Mulhearn and Harry Dowd. He was succeeded by Reuben Noble-Lazarus on 30th September 2008 at being the youngest player to debut in the English Football League.

References

1946 births
Living people
People from Darton
Association football goalkeepers
English footballers
Barnsley F.C. players
Manchester City F.C. players
Stockport County F.C. players
Darlington F.C. players
English Football League players
Footballers from Yorkshire